William Clarence Eaket Secondary School, also known as Eaket, is the only English language high school in Blind River, Ontario, Canada. It is operated by the Algoma District School Board, and as of 2006 it had 312 students and 59 faculty members. The only other high school in Blind River is École Secondaire Jeunesse Nord (Northern Youth Secondary School), which is a solely French-language school.  

The school was founded in 1958 as Blind River District High School.

See also
List of high schools in Ontario

References

External links 
 Algoma District School Board
 W.C. Eaket Secondary School

High schools in Algoma District
Educational institutions established in 1958
1958 establishments in Ontario